Minamoto no Mitsuyuki (源 光行 1163–1244) was governor in Kawachi province. Mitsuyuki's cousin was the famous samurai Yorimasa.

People of Heian-period Japan
People of Kamakura-period Japan
1163 births
1244 deaths
Governors of Japanese prefectures